The Dufuna canoe is a dugout canoe discovered in 1987 by a Fulani cattle herdsman a few kilometers from the village of Dufuna in the Fune Local Government Area, not far from the Komadugu Gana River, in Yobe State, Nigeria. Radiocarbon dating of a sample of charcoal found near the site dates the canoe at 8,500 to 8,000 years old, linking the site to Lake Chad. It is currently located in Damaturu, Nigeria.

Background
The Dufuna canoe was found in the village of Dufuna, which is located between Potiskum and Gashua, in Yobe State. On 4 May 1987, Mallam Ya'u, a Fulani cow herdsman was digging a well and hit a hard object at 4.5 meters. He informed his village chief about the discovery.

In 1989 and 1990, the University of Maiduguri carried out an initial exploration of the site to ascertain whether it was a canoe as well take radiocarbon dating samples of the wood. Later, in a joint research project funded by the University of Frankfurt and Maiduguri by Professors Peter Breunig and Garba Abubakar, would return to the site and further wood samples were taken and dated by two German laboratories.

In 1994, an archaeology team from Germany and Nigeria excavated the site and the canoe was dug out over two weeks by fifty labourers and was found to be 8.4 meters in length, 0.5 meters wide and 5cm thick. The canoe was found in a water logged state resting on a sandy bed while layers of clay lay between it and the surface which protected it in an oxygen free environment. Examination of the canoe showed that the bow and stern had been skilfully worked to points and that the work was carried out by "core axe-like and pick-axe bifacial tools of micro-lithic appearance". Professor Breunig said that the skill of construction showed a long development and that the canoe was not a new design. In another study by an American science team in 2015, they found that Lake Chad had shrunk by 95% in forty years and therefore it could be assumed that area of the village of Dufuna would have been part of the lake's flood plain in the distant past.

The canoe has been radiocarbon dated at least twice, and was dated to 6556-6388 BCE and to 6164-6005 BCE, making it the oldest known boat in Africa and the second oldest worldwide. It was probably created in a longstanding boat-making tradition and used in fishing along the Komadugu Gana River. It may have been constructed by members of a population group that occupied an area from western region of the Sahara, to the Nile of central Sudan, to the northern region of Kenya.

See also
 Traditional fishing boats
 List of oldest ships

References

Canoes
History of Northern Nigeria
Water transport in Nigeria
1987 archaeological discoveries